Chad's Tree are an Australian rock band, formed in Perth in 1983 with two brothers, Mark and Rob Snarski, as the driving force. The band's brittle, off-kilter sound evoked the sense of distance, desolation, harshness and loneliness of the Nullarbor Plain (but also its fragile nature), much in the same fashion as fellow Perth outfit The Triffids.

Biography
The Snarskis were born in London, to Polish refugee parents, and grew up on a 36 hectare farm on the outskirts of Perth, Western Australia.

Their teenage musical passions were shared – Explosive Hits '77, the Doors, the Velvet Underground, Television.

The band relocated to Sydney in 1984, the remainder of the band followed some months later in James Hurst's kombi.  In 1985 Amanda Brown (The Go-Betweens) was asked to record with the band (she appears on two tracks on the band's debut album Buckle in the Rail) and was invited to join the band.  In the end she rejected the offer and became a permanent member of The Go-Betweens.

Chad's Tree supported not only John Cale in their first year, but also Nico, at the Prince of Wales in St Kilda, shortly after they moved east in the mid-1980s

Chad's Tree issued its debut 7-inch single "Crush the Lily"/"Toll for Josephine" in November 1985 on the Hot label. They released subsequent singles, "Sweet Jesus Blue Eyes"/"To the Highest Bidder" in February 1987 and "Stroller in the Attic"/"The Orchard" in March 1988, as well as their debut album Buckle in the Rail in January 1987 on the Nude label. The "Crush the Lily" and "Sweet Jesus Blue Eyes" singles were also combined on the four-track, 12-inch EP Chad's Tree for release in the United Kingdom through Rough Trade Records. 

There were a number of different line-ups over the course of six years. As well as Kim Bettenay, the band's bass players included Mark Hemery, Peter Michael, Barry Turnbull and Simon Kain. Susan Grigg joined on piano and violin in 1987, and was replaced by Kathy Wemyss in 1989. Jason Kain (lead guitar, ex-Wet Taxis) also replaced Robert Snarski, who returned to Perth in October 1988 and went on to form The Blackeyed Susans The band issued a second album, Kerosene, in March 1989. 

After the band broke up Mark Snarski and Wemyss formed the Jackson Code. After touring with American crime writer James Ellroy in 1996, Mark left Australia for Europe finally settling in Madrid. Rob Snarski lives in Melbourne, where he joined and is a pivotal member of The Blackeyed Susans.

In March 2010 Memorandum Records released a compilation album, Crossing Off the Miles, which included both studio albums, all the band's single and B-sides, together with eleven early demos and live recordings. The release also included a 32-page booklet with photos and liner notes from eight contributors including both Rob and Mark Snarski, authors Niall Lucy and David Nichols and band insiders.

Members
 Mark Snarski – vocals
 Rob Snarski – vocals, guitar, bass
 Jason Kain – guitar
 Kathy Wemyss – vocals, violin, trumpet
 James Hurst – drums
 Kenny Davis Junior – violin
 Sue Grigg – violin, piano
 Amanda Brown – violin
 Rodney Howard – bass
 Peter Michael – bass
 Kim Bettenay – bass
 Barry Turnbull – bass
 Mark Hemery – bass
 Simon Kain – bass

Discography

Albums/EPs
 Chad's Tree (EP) – Hot Records (HOT 1229) (1986)
 Buckle in the Rail – Nude Records (Fine 1) (January 1987)
 Kerosene – Nude Records (DAMP96) (March 1989)
 Crossing Off the Miles – Memorandum Records (MEMO7) (22 March 2010)

Singles
 "Crush The Lily" / "Toll For Josephine" – Hot Records (HOT 727) (November 1985)
 "Sweet Jesus Blue Eyes" / "To The Highest Bidder" – Nude Records (FIG 100) (February 1987)
 "The Orchard" / "Stroller in the Attic" – Nude Records (FIG 110) (March 1988)

Compilations
 This Is Too Hot – Hot Records (1986) – "Crush The Lily"
 High Temperature: A Collection Of Hot Records From 1982 – 1985 – Hot Records (1986) – "Crush the Lily"

References

External links
 AMO Artist profile – Snarski & Luscombe
 Chad's Tree @ musicbrainz
 Chad's Tree @ discogs
 Crossing Off The Miles CD review
 Rate Your Music – Chad's Tree Discography
 Record cover art at prehistoricsounds.com

Australian indie rock groups
Western Australian musical groups
Musical groups established in 1983
Musical groups disestablished in 1989